Machir ben Judah was a French Jewish scholar of the tenth and eleventh centuries, born at Metz, and brother of R. Gershom "the Light of the Exile" (Me'or ha-Golah).

He is known by his dictionary entitled Alfa Beta de-R. Makir, not extant, but quoted often by Rashi, RaSHBaM, Eliezer b. Nathan, Jacob Tam, and other tosafists. Machir adopted for the most part the interpretations of his brother, who was Nathan ben Jehiel's teacher. Still he sometimes differed from his brother in the interpretation of words, and in such cases Nathan often adopted the opinion of Machir (comp. Jacob Tam, Sefer ha-Yashar, p. 58b), though he never quotes him in his  'Aruk.

The quotations from Machir by Rashi and the other rabbis mentioned above were collected by Solomon L. Rapoport in his biography of Nathan b. Jehiel (Bikkure ha-'Ittim, x. 8, xi. 82).

References

10th-century French rabbis
11th-century French rabbis
French lexicographers
Rabbis from Metz
French male non-fiction writers